= Internationales Figurentheaterfestival =

Festival

Internationales Figurentheaterfestival is a theatre festival in Germany.
